Jefferson Community College may refer to:

 Jefferson Community College, now known as Jefferson Community and Technical College, a two-year Kentucky college 
 Jefferson Community College (New York), a two-year college located in Watertown, New York
 Jefferson Community College (Ohio), in Jefferson County, Ohio
 Jefferson Community College (Missouri), in Jefferson County, Missouri